In measure theory Prokhorov's theorem relates tightness of measures to relative compactness (and hence weak convergence) in the space of probability measures. It is credited to the Soviet mathematician Yuri Vasilyevich Prokhorov, who considered probability measures on complete separable metric spaces. The term "Prokhorov’s theorem" is also applied to later generalizations to either the direct or the inverse statements.

Statement

Let  be a separable metric space. 

Theorem.
 The space  with the topology of weak convergence is metrizable.
  Suppose  that in addition,  is a complete metric space (so that  is a Polish space).

Corollaries

For Euclidean spaces we have that:

Extension

Prokhorov's theorem can be extended to consider complex measures or finite signed measures.

Theorem:
The following statements are equivalent:
 is sequentially precompact; that is, every sequence  has a weakly convergent subsequence.
  is tight and uniformly bounded in total variation norm.

Comments

Since Prokhorov's theorem expresses tightness in terms of compactness, the Arzelà–Ascoli theorem is often used to substitute for compactness: in function spaces, this leads to a characterization of tightness in terms of the modulus of continuity or an appropriate analogue—see tightness in classical Wiener space and tightness in Skorokhod space.

There are several deep and non-trivial extensions to Prokhorov's theorem. However, those results  do not overshadow the importance and the relevance to applications of the original result.

See also

References

 
 
 
 

Compactness theorems
Theorems in measure theory